Gamboa is a surname of Basque origin. Notable people with the surname include:

Art and entertainment
Diane Gamboa (born 1957), an American artist
Harry Gamboa, Jr. (born 1951), a Mexican-American writer and artist
Helen Gamboa (born 1945), a Filipino actress and singer
Hernán Gamboa (1946–2016), a Venezuelan musician
Isaías Gamboa (1872–1904), a Colombian poet
Isaias Gamboa (music producer) (born 1963), a Costa Rican-American music producer and author
Jorge and Lorena Gamboa, Spanish singers and evangelists
Joross Gamboa (born 1984), a Filipino actor and model
Juan Pablo Gamboa (born 1966), a Colombian actor
Oscar Perdomo Gamboa (born 1974), a Colombian writer
Santiago Gamboa (born 1965), a Colombian writer

Crime
Gregorio Sauceda-Gamboa (born ca. 1965), a Mexican drug trafficker
Héctor Manuel Sauceda Gamboa (died 2009), a Mexican mob boss

Exploration
Martín Ruiz de Gamboa (1533–1590), a Spanish Basque conquistador
Pedro Sarmiento de Gamboa (1532–1592), a Spanish explorer, historian, and scientist

Politics
Emilio Gamboa Patrón (born 1950), a Mexican politician
Joaquín Gamboa Pascoe, a Mexican politician and union leader
Lizbeth Gamboa Song (born 1981), a Mexican politician
Raúl Ríos Gamboa (born 1973), a Mexican politician
Roberto Colín Gamboa (born 1956), a Mexican politician

Sports
Anibal Gamboa (1948–2020), Venezuelan chess master
Cristian Gamboa (born 1989), a Costa Rican footballer
Delio Gamboa (born 1936), a Colombian footballer
Eddie Gamboa (born 1984), an American baseball player
Fernando Gamboa (born 1970), an Argentine footballer
Francisco Castro Gamboa (born 1990), a Chilean footballer
Francisco Gamboa (born 1985), a Mexican footballer
Jorge Gamboa, a Chilean cyclist
Julio Gamboa (born 1971), a Nicaraguan boxer
Ludovic Gamboa (born 1986), a French footballer
Miguel Ángel Gamboa (born 1951), a Chilean footballer
Tom Gamboa (born 1948), an American baseball coach and manager
Yuriorkis Gamboa (born 1981), a Cuban boxer

Other
Francisco Javier Carrillo Gamboa, a Mexican academic
Graciano Ricalde Gamboa (1873–1942), a Mexican mathematician
Patrocinio Gamboa (1865–1953), a Filipino revolutionary
Pearlasia Gamboa, a Filipino-American businesswoman

Basque-language surnames